Blanckenberg is a surname. Notable people with the surname include:

Gareth Blanckenberg (born 1980), South African sailor
Jimmy Blanckenberg (1892–1955), South African cricketer